A jukebox is a partially automated music-playing device, usually a coin-operated machine, that will play a patron's selection from self-contained media. The classic jukebox has buttons, with letters and numbers on them, which are used to select a specific record. Some may use compact discs instead. Disc changers are similar devices that are intended for home use, are small enough to fit in a shelf, may hold up to hundreds of discs, and allow discs to be easily removed, replaced, and inserted by the user.

History
Coin-operated music boxes and player pianos were the first forms of automated coin-operated musical devices. These devices used paper rolls, metal disks, or metal cylinders to play a musical selection on an actual instrument, or on several actual instruments, enclosed within the device.

In the 1890s, these devices were joined by machines which used recordings instead of actual physical instruments.

In 1889, Louis Glass and William S. Arnold invented the nickel-in-the-slot phonograph, in San Francisco. This was an Edison Class M Electric Phonograph retrofitted with a device patented under the name of 'Coin Actuated Attachment for Phonograph'. The music was heard via one of four listening tubes.

In 1928, Justus P. Seeburg, who was manufacturing player pianos, combined an electrostatic loudspeaker with a record player that was coin-operated. This 'Audiophone' machine was wide and bulky because it had eight separate turntables mounted on a rotating Ferris wheel-like device, allowing patrons to select from eight different records.

Later versions of the jukebox included Seeburg's Selectophone with 10 turntables mounted vertically on a spindle. By maneuvering the tone arm up and down, the customer could select from 10 different records.
	
The word "jukebox" came into use in the United States beginning in 1940, apparently derived from the familiar usage "juke joint", derived from the Gullah word juke, which means "bawdy".

 Wallboxes were an important, and profitable, part of any jukebox installation. Serving as a remote control, they enabled patrons to select tunes from their table or booth. One example is the Seeburg 3W1, introduced in 1949 as companion to the 100-selection Model M100A jukebox. Stereo sound became popular in the early 1960s, and wallboxes of the era were designed with built-in speakers to provide patrons a sample of this latest technology.

Jukeboxes were most popular from the 1940s through the mid-1960s, particularly during the 1950s. By the middle of the 1940s, three-quarters of the records produced in America went into jukeboxes. Billboard published a record chart measuring jukebox play during the 1950s, which briefly became a component of the Hot 100; by 1959, the jukebox's popularity had waned to the point where Billboard ceased publishing the chart and stopped collecting jukebox play data.

As of 2016, at least two companies still manufacture classically styled jukeboxes: Rockola, based in California, and Sound Leisure, based in Leeds in the UK. Both companies manufacture jukeboxes based on a CD playing mechanism. However, in April 2016, Sound Leisure showed a prototype of a "Vinyl Rocket" at the UK Classic Car Show. It stated that it would start production of the 140 7" vinyl selector (70 records) in summer of the same year.

Since 2018, Orphéau, based in Brittany in France manufactures the original styled "Sunflower" Jukebox with the first 12" vinyl record selector (20 records), on both sides.

Notable models
 1927 LINK – valued at US$40,000 and extremely rare
 1940 Gabel Kuro – 78 rpm, the last model of this manufacturer, four or five are known to exist and are valued at US$125,000
 1942 Rock-Ola President – only one known to exist and valued at least US$150,000
 1942 Rock-Ola Premier – 15 known to exist and valued at US$20,000
 1942 Wurlitzer 950 – 75–90 known to exist and valued at US$35,000
 1946 Wurlitzer Model 1015, – referred to as the "1015 bubbler" offered 24 selections. More than 56,000 were sold in less than two years and it is considered a pop culture icon. Designed by Wurlitzer's Paul Fuller.
 1952 Seeburg M100C – This was the jukebox exterior used in the credit sequences for Happy Days in seasons 1–10. It played up to fifty 45 rpm records making it a 100-play. It was a very colorful jukebox with chrome glass tubes on the front, mirrors in the display, and rotating animation in the pilasters.
 1967 Rock-Ola 434 Concerto – This was the jukebox interior used in the credit sequence for the 11th and final season of Happy Days. Like the Seeburg M100C, it played up to fifty 45 rpm records, but featured a horizontal playback mechanism unlike the M100C.
2018 Orphéau Sunflower Serie. This was the first Jukebox playing up to twenty 33 rpm records on both sides using automation technology.

Decline
Traditional jukeboxes once were an important source of income for record publishers. Jukeboxes received the newest recordings first. They became an important market-testing device for new music, since they tallied the number of plays for each title. They offered a means for the listener to control the music outside of their home, before audio technology became portable. They played music on demand without commercials. They also offered the opportunity for high fidelity listening before home high fidelity equipment became affordable.

In 1995, the United States Postal Service issued a 25-cent stamp commemorating the phonograph jukebox.

Modern derivatives

Jukebox digital music players

The term "jukebox" was used to describe high-capacity, hard disk based digital audio players due to their amount of digital space allowing a great number of music to be stored and played. The term was popularised following the introduction of the Creative NOMAD Jukebox in 2000, which could store as many as 150 CDs of music on its 6 gigabyte hard drive. In later years, the "classic" iPod would become the most popular product in this category.

Digital jukebox and apps
While the number of traditional jukeboxes has declined, digital jukeboxes, also called "social jukebox", have been introduced.

See also

 BAL-AMi Jukeboxes
 Music box
 Player piano
 Rock-Ola
 Seeburg 1000
 Sound Leisure
 Vending machine

References

External links
 

Musical culture
American inventions
Audio engineering
Commercial machines
Vending machines